Kombu is an edible kelp.

Kombu may also refer to:
Kombu (instrument), a wind instrument (kind of trumpet) from South India.
Kombu green, a variation of chartreuse
Sassafras albidum, a tree that produces sassafras oil, called "kombu" in Choctaw

See also
Kelp, seaweed
Kombucha, a fermented tea